Thomas Beatty Elliott (born 11 December 1963) is an Ulster Unionist Party (UUP) politician who has been a Member of the Northern Ireland Assembly (MLA) for Fermanagh and South Tyrone since 2022, having previously served from 2003 to 2015. He was the Member of Parliament (MP)  for Fermanagh and South Tyrone from 2015 to 2017, and was the leader of the UUP between 2010 and 2012.

He was a soldier in the Ulster Defence Regiment (UDR) from 1982 to 1992 and its successor the Royal Irish Regiment from 1992 to 1999. He backed a Leave vote in the 2016 EU membership referendum.

Education
Elliott received his primary and high school education in his native Ballinamallard. Later, he earned a College Certificate in Agriculture from the Enniskillen College of Agriculture.

Political

Elliott has been an activist in the Ballinamallard Ward Ulster Unionist Party (UUP) committee for many years and is chairman of that committee. He has also been Honorary Secretary of the Fermanagh Divisional Unionist Association since 1998 and was chairman of the internal Ulster Unionist ad hoc Review Group for its duration.

In November 2003 he was elected as a member of the Northern Ireland Assembly representing Fermanagh and South Tyrone, a position to which he was re-elected in March 2007 and May 2011. In this role he served as Ulster Unionist Assembly spokesperson on Agriculture and Rural Affairs.

Elliott was selected as the UUP candidate for Fermanagh and South Tyrone UK Parliament constituency in the 2005 general election and came in third behind the Sinn Féin and DUP candidates. The UUP share of the vote fell from 34% in 2001 to 18% in 2005.

He was reselected for the 2010 general election, but stood down in favour of independent Unionist candidate Rodney Connor. With the DUP, TUV, UKIP and the Conservatives not contesting the seat in 2015, Elliott, as the sole unionist candidate, won the seat at the 2015 election. He lost the seat in the 2017 general election, with 45.5% of the vote to 47.2% for Sinn Féin's Michelle Gildernew. He ran again in 2019, but lost to Gildernew by 57 votes, with 43.2% of the vote to Gildernew's 43.3%.

Elliott returned to the Assembly following the 2022 election, again representing Fermanagh and South Tyrone again. His running mate, Rosemary Barton, lost her seat while Elliott was successful in holding the UUP seat for the constituency.

Party leadership
In June 2010, Elliott announced his intention to run in the 2010 Ulster Unionist Party leadership election. He was elected although not without some controversy. It emerged shortly before the leadership election that a quarter of the UUP membership came from Fermanagh and South Tyrone, a disproportionately high figure. The Phoenix, an Irish political magazine, described Elliott as a "blast from the past" and that his election signified "a significant shift to the right" by the UUP.

In March 2012, he announced that he would step down as leader of the Ulster Unionists.

When asked about his reasoning, he said that "some people have not given [him] a fair opportunity at developing and progressing many initiatives", going on to say that some of the hostility began immediately after he was selected as leader. He also accused some party members of making his job more difficult by briefing journalists.

His resignation triggered the 2012 Ulster Unionist Party leadership election.

When Elliott took over the leadership of the UUP in 2010 the party had recently received 102,361 votes which amounted to 15.2% of the vote. In Elliott's first election in charge in the 2011 Assembly elections the UUP only received 87,531 votes which amounted to 13.2% of the vote and resulted in the party losing two of its MLAs. On the same day in 2011 the UUP also lost 16 of its Council seats.

Membership of the Loyal Orders
Elliott is a member of the Orange Order within Fermanagh, the Royal Black Preceptory and the Kesh branch of the Apprentice Boys of Derry (ABOD).

Controversies
Elliott stated publicly that he wouldn't attend gay pride parades or Gaelic Athletic Association matches, but did later meet with some gay rights groups and GAA figures in Northern Ireland.

After he was elected in the 2011 Assembly election, in his victory speech in Omagh Elliott referred to the Irish tricolour as a "flag of a foreign nation". When the audience started heckling him, he went on to describe nationalist supporters holding Irish flags as "the scum of Sinn Féin". Although initially refusing to retract his comment he later issued an apology "to all those good nationalists, republicans, even Sinn Fein voters who felt offended by it."

In August 2012, Elliott opposed money being spent on public inquests into people killed by the British Army and loyalist paramilitaries during the Troubles. He urged relatives of those killed by the IRA—whom he called "the real victims"—to band together to "choke the system up" and stop such inquests happening. He later clarified his remarks saying "At no stage did I suggest or infer that anyone killed in the Troubles, who was not murdered by the IRA, were 'not real victims'".

In February 2016, Elliott was criticised when he provided a statement to a court on behalf of a convicted benefit cheat. The judge in the case said he received a letter from a "senior politician" that spoke "glowingly" of the convicted man's work in the voluntary sector. Elliott denied it was a character reference. That same month, he was criticised by a judge for writing a testimonial for a man convicted for driving while disqualified. Although not naming Elliott in court he said he "crossed the line of the independence of the court" and "trespassed on the sentencing process."

Elliott settled a defamation case with Attorney General John Larkin by issuing a statement through his barrister and donating an undisclosed sum of money to charity. Under the terms of the settlement the following statement was read out by Elliott's senior counsel:"On 20 April 2016, during the course of a live debate on the Stephen Nolan BBC Radio Ulster show, Mr Elliott made a number of statements which may have been taken to imply that the attorney general, John Larkin, had failed to discharge his professional duties impartially and with fairness. Mr Elliott wishes to confirm that he did not intend to impugn the integrity of Mr Larkin or for any such inferences to be taken from his statements. Mr Elliott regrets any embarrassment which this may have caused Mr Larkin."

References

External links
Northern Ireland Assembly profile
Ulster Unionist Party profile

|-

|-

1963 births
Anglicans from Northern Ireland
Members of Fermanagh District Council
Farmers from Northern Ireland
Leaders of the Ulster Unionist Party
Living people
Northern Ireland MLAs 2003–2007
Northern Ireland MLAs 2007–2011
Northern Ireland MLAs 2011–2016
People from County Fermanagh
Royal Irish Regiment (1992) soldiers
UK MPs 2015–2017
Members of the Parliament of the United Kingdom for Fermanagh and South Tyrone (since 1950)
Ulster Defence Regiment soldiers
Ulster Unionist Party members of the House of Commons of the United Kingdom
Ulster Unionist Party MLAs
Northern Ireland MLAs 2022–2027